Dhaka Division (Ḍhaka Bibhag) is an administrative division within Bangladesh. Dhaka serves as the capital city of the Dhaka Division, the Dhaka District and Bangladesh.  The division remains a population magnet, covers an area of 20,508.8 km2 with a population in excess of 44 million, growing at 1.94% rate since prior count, compared with national average of 1.22%. However, national figures may include data skewing expatriation of male labor force as gender ratio is skewed towards females.

Dhaka Division borders every other division in the country except Rangpur Division. It is bounded by Mymensingh Division to the north, Barisal Division to the south, Chittagong Division to the east and south-east, Sylhet Division to the north-east, and Rajshahi Division to the west and Khulna Divisions to the south-west.

Administrative divisions

Dhaka Division consisted before 2015 of four city corporations, 13 districts, 123 upazilas and 1,248 union parishads. However, four of the most northerly of the 17 districts were removed in 2015 to create the new Mymensingh Division, and another five districts (those situated to the south of the Ganges/Padma River) are in the process of being removed to create a new Faridpur Division.

Note: * revised area and its population after excluding the districts transferred to the new Mymensingh Division.

Sources 
Census figures for 1991, 2001, 2011 and 2022 are from Bangladesh Bureau of Statistics, Population Census Wing. The 2022 Census figures are based on preliminary results.

References

External links 

Dhaka Division
Divisions of Bangladesh
Eastern Bengal